Candy cigarettes are a candy introduced in the late 19th century made out of chalky sugar, bubblegum or chocolate, wrapped in paper and packaged and branded so as to resemble cigarettes. Some products contain powdered sugar hidden in the wrapper, allowing the user to blow into the cigarette and produce a cloud of sugar that imitates smoke, which comes out of the other end.

Candy cigarettes' place on the market has long been controversial because many critics believe the candy desensitizes children, leading them to become smokers later in life. Candy cigarettes can also serve as a way to market cigarettes to children, as many candy cigarettes have branding nearly identical to cigarette brands. Because of this, the selling of candy cigarettes has been banned in several countries even though they continue to be manufactured and consumed in many parts of the world. However, many manufacturers now describe their products as candy sticks, bubble gum, or simply candy.

Tobacco companies and candy cigarette manufacturers have cooperated to make candy cigarettes. Tobacco companies have allowed candy cigarette companies to use their branding; Brown & Williamson has gone as far as to send copies of its labels to candy cigarette companies. After the 1964 Surgeon General's report on smoking and health criticized candy cigarettes for "trying to lure youngsters into the smoking habit", tobacco companies began to distance themselves from candy cigarettes, although trademark infringement lawsuits against candy cigarette manufacturers have been rare.

A 1990 study found that sixth graders who ate candy cigarettes were twice as likely to smoke cigarettes than those who did not eat candy cigarettes. A 2007 study surveyed 25,887 adults and found that "[c]andy cigarette consumption was reported by 88% of both current and former smokers and 78% of never smokers", a statistically significant difference that the authors suggested indicates a connection between candy cigarette consumption as a child and smoking as an adult.

In the United States, it was reported erroneously in 2010 that the Family Smoking and Prevention Control Act bans candy cigarettes. However, the rule bans any form of added flavoring in tobacco cigarettes other than menthol. It does not regulate the candy industry. Popeye Cigarettes marketed using the Popeye character were sold for a while and had red tips (to look like a lit cigarette) before being renamed candy sticks and being manufactured without the red tip. Most candy cigarettes continue to be manufactured in the United States, with the largest maker of candy cigarettes, World Confections Inc, being based in New Jersey.

Sales laws

See also
Big League Chew
Bubble pipe
FADS Fun Sticks
Hippy Sippy
Licorice pipe

References

External links

 Candy cigarettes
 Candy cigarette collection

Candy
Cigarettes